Pedro Moreno (born 29 June 1951) is a former footballer who played professionally in Spain's La Liga.

Career
Born in Las Palmas, Moreno moved to Argentina where he began his football career with Ferro Carril Oeste. At age 21, he returned to Spain where he signed with Granada CF. He played sparingly during his first season with the club, and moved on loan to Segunda División side Levante UD for the second half of the 1973–74 season. Moreno also played for CP Mérida.

Personal
Moreno's son, Iván, is also a professional footballer.

References

1951 births
Living people
Spanish footballers
Ferro Carril Oeste footballers
Granada CF footballers
Levante UD footballers
Association football defenders